Karam Barnawi (born October 6, 1987) is a Saudi Arabian footballer who currently plays as a right-back for Al-Ain.

Honours
Al-Kawkab
Saudi Second Division: 2016–17

Abha
MS League: 2018–19

References

External links 
 

1987 births
Living people
Saudi Arabian footballers
Association football fullbacks
Al-Ansar FC (Medina) players
Al-Ahli Saudi FC players
Najran SC players
Ohod Club players
Al-Fayha FC players
Al-Kawkab FC players
Abha Club players
Al-Ain FC (Saudi Arabia) players
Saudi First Division League players
Saudi Professional League players
Saudi Second Division players